John Angus McDonald Hansen (born 3 February 1950 in Sauchie, Clackmannanshire) is a Scottish former footballer who played professionally solely for Partick Thistle as a defender.

Club career
The older brother of the more noted player Alan Hansen (who also began his career with Partick Thistle), John played as a right-back or centre-half. He attended a rugby-playing school (Alloa Academy) and only began to play football as a teenager, joining local club Sauchie Juniors before being brought to Firhill.

Hansen was part of the Thistle team that was relegated in 1970, promoted as lower division winners in 1971 and then defeated Celtic 4–1 in the 1971 Scottish League Cup Final. Between 1967 and 1978 he played 213 league games, scoring 6 goals in the process. He played alongside his younger brother for four seasons, during which the club were relegated in a league restructure in 1975 but bounced back as second-tier champions again in 1976 and finished fifth in the 1976–77 Scottish Premier Division.

Persistent knee injuries dogged his career, with various operations on his cartilage and cruciate ligament ending the possibility of a move to Manchester United, robbing him of the chance to compete in Europe following the League Cup win, and eventually forcing his retirement from playing aged just 27.

International career
Hansen won two caps for Scotland under manager Tommy Docherty, playing against Belgium in a 1–0 victory in a European Championship Qualifier, and against Yugoslavia in a 2–2 draw in the Brazilian Independence Cup.

Later life
Following his retirement as a player, Hansen spent some time working for Partick Thistle as the club's public relations officer. He is married to Sandra Ann and now lives in Surrey with his son Simon.

References

External links 

1950 births
Living people
Sportspeople from Clackmannanshire
Association football fullbacks
Scottish footballers
Scotland international footballers
Partick Thistle F.C. players
Scottish Football League players
Sauchie F.C. players
Scottish Junior Football Association players
Scottish people of Danish descent